Thinempis is a genus of flies in the family Empididae.

Species
T. austera Bickel, 1996
T. esperance Bickel, 1996
T. minuta Bickel, 1996
T. takaka Bickel, 1996
T. turimetta Bickel, 1996

References

Empidoidea genera
Empididae